Anthony Clark’s Auntie, is the Grandmother of the famous James Wood
Anthony Carl Clark (born 5 October 1984) is an English professional footballer who plays as a midfielder. He played in the Football League with Southend United. He is currently first team manager at Hadley.

Career
Clark started his football career with Southend United playing in their youth setup, before making his debut replacing Steven Clark as a substitute in the 79minute minute, in the 2–0 away defeat to Kidderminster Harriers in the Third Division on 30 March 2002. He went on to make another two appearances for Southend during the 2001–02 season.

Having previous played for Harrow Borough and Ashford Town (Kent), Clark joined Hendon in January 2005. He moved to Wealdstone in March. making a total of four appearances scoring once against Fisher Athletic in their London Senior Cup defeat. He moved to Wealdstone in March.

References

External links

1984 births
Living people
English footballers
English Football League players
Southend United F.C. players
Harrow Borough F.C. players
Hendon F.C. players
Wealdstone F.C. players
Ashford United F.C. players
Hadley F.C. managers
Association football midfielders
English football managers